Argoños is a municipality located in the autonomous community of Cantabria, Spain. According to the 2007 census, the city has a population of 1.260 inhabitants.

Towns
Ancillo
Argoños (Capital)
Cerecedas
Santiuste

References

External links

Municipalities in Cantabria